Claudemir Vítor Marques (born 28 September 1972), commonly known as Vítor, is a retired Brazilian footballer who spent most of his career in Brazil.

Playing career
He also played briefly for Real Madrid. When the club tried to sign Cafu for the 1993–94 season, São Paulo asked them to wait for the winter transfer window so he could play the Intercontinental Cup and offered them Vítor on loan in the meanwhile. He just took part in the first three fixtures of the championship.

Years later he played against Real Madrid in the 1998 Intercontinental Cup, while he played for Vasco da Gama on loan from Cruzeiro.

Career statistics

Club

Notes

International

References

1972 births
Living people
Brazilian footballers
Brazilian expatriate footballers
Brazil international footballers
Association football defenders
São Paulo FC players
Real Madrid CF players
Sport Club Corinthians Paulista players
Cruzeiro Esporte Clube players
CR Vasco da Gama players
Associação Atlética Internacional (Limeira) players
Kocaelispor footballers
Ceará Sporting Club players
Osasco Futebol Clube players
Mogi Mirim Esporte Clube players
Clube Atlético Juventus players
Campeonato Brasileiro Série A players
La Liga players
Süper Lig players
Brazilian expatriate sportspeople in Spain
Expatriate footballers in Spain
Brazilian expatriate sportspeople in Turkey
Expatriate footballers in Turkey
People from Mogi Guaçu